D'Hondt is a Dutch surname, most common in East Flanders. Variants are D'Hont, De Hondt and Dhondt. D'Hondt is an old spelling of de hond ("the dog"). The  was also the name of the bay that is now the Eastern end of the Western Scheldt. People with this name include:

D'Hondt
Danica d'Hondt (born 1939),  English-born Canadian actress, writer and businesswoman
Daniël D'Hondt (born 1961), Belgian football goalkeeper
Eddie D'Hondt (born 1959), American NASCAR driver; owner of the D'Hondt Humphrey Motorsports team
Gillian d'Hondt (born 1982), Canadian-American basketball player
Paula D'Hondt (born 1926), Belgian politician, Minister of State in 1992
Steven D'Hondt (born 1960s), American marine microbiologist
Victor D'Hondt (1841–1901), Belgian lawyer, jurist and mathematician
Named after him: D'Hondt method, a method for allocating political seats
Walter D'Hondt (born 1936), Canadian rower
D'Hont
Pieter d'Hont (1917–1997), Dutch sculptor

See also
 De Hondt
 Dhondt

References

Dutch-language surnames
Surnames of Belgian origin